Royal National Lifeboat Institution (RNLI) stations are the bases for the RNLI's fleet of search and rescue lifeboats that cover the coastal waters around the entire British Isles, as well as major inland waterways.

The service was established in 1824 and is operated largely by volunteers. Its headquarters are at Poole, Dorset and it is a registered charity in both the United Kingdom and Republic of Ireland.

Key

Lifeboat types 

The types of boats provided at each station and the launching methods vary depending on local needs. If more than one boat is provided they are sometimes stationed in separate buildings at different locations in the same town. Current RNLI boats fall into three broad groups:
 Hovercraft: H-class

Launch methods 

The principal launching methods are:

 Carriage – an ALB or ILB is pushed into the water on a carriage by a tractor
 Davit – an ALB or ILB is lowered into the water by a crane
 Launchway – an ILB is pushed into the water on a carriage by hand
 Moored afloat – an ALB or ILB is kept in the water alongside the lifeboat station or nearby, in which case a small boarding boat is provided so that the crew can reach it
 Slipway – an ALB slides down a slipway straight into the water
 Transporter – hovercraft are kept on the rear of trucks that can transport and offload them anywhere

Regions 
The following lists do not include the lifeguard patrolled beaches which also have their own equipment including inflatable boats and jetskis. The information is correct to 2009 unless noted otherwise, and is set out like the RNLI's divisional model. As far as possible it follows a clockwise route around the coast.

 North and East Region – North East and East England (Berwick-upon-Tweed - Burnham-on-Crouch)
 South East Region - South and South East England (Southend on Sea - Swanage)
 South West Region – South West England and the Channel Islands (Weymouth - Portishead)
 Wales and West Region – Wales and North West England and the Isle of Man (Penarth - Silloth)
 Scotland Region – Scotland
 Ireland Region – Republic of Ireland and Northern Ireland

List of stations by Region

North & East Region

South East Region

South West Region

Wales, West & Isle of Man Region

Scotland Region

Ireland Region

See also 

 List of RNLB lifeboats

References

External links

 RNLI lifeboat stations

RNLI

Stations
RNLI